Michel Le Moignan (November 7, 1919 – December 21, 2000) was a Catholic priest and a Canadian politician from Quebec.

Political career

Born in Grande-Rivière, Quebec, Le Moignan won a seat to the National Assembly of Quebec in the 1976 provincial election in the district of Gaspé as a member of the Union Nationale.

After party leader Rodrigue Biron left the party in 1980, Le Moignan became the Union Nationale's parliamentary leader for the remainder of the term. Roch La Salle, a Progressive Conservative Party of Canada Member of Parliament, led the party into the 1981 provincial election. The party was wiped out and Le Moignan finishing a distant third in his constituency.

References

1919 births
2000 deaths
20th-century Canadian Roman Catholic priests
Union Nationale (Quebec) MNAs
Université Laval alumni